This page lists all of the numbered county roads in Lambton County, Ontario

Lambton
Transport in Lambton County